Jan Jakob Tønseth (1 September 1947 – 12 October 2018) was a Norwegian author, poet and translator.

Tønseth debuted as a poet with the poetry collection Kimærer in 1971,  when he was only 24 years of age. He achieved broad recognition as a novelist with his trilogy about the ex-communist Hilmar Iversen (Hilmar Iversens ensomhet (1992), Et vennskap (1997) and Resignasjon og portvin (2002)). Tønseth was a member of Norwegian Academy for Language and Literature.

Bibliography

Poetry
Kimærer – poetry collection  (1971)
I denne tid – poetry collection, (1974)
Synlige dikt – poetry collection  (1977)
Referanser (fjerne og nære) – poetry collection  (1979)
Lengsel og lede – poetry collection  (1987)
Motgift – poetry collection  (1994)
Fromme vers for enkle sjeler – poetry collection  (2008)

Prose
Drømmer og løgner – prose (1982)
På krigsfot med virkeligheten – essay collection  (1984)
Antagelser – (1984), together with John David Nielsen (malerier) )
Hilmar Iversens ensomhet – novel (1992) )
Et vennskap – novel (1997)
En rar skrue – biography of Kjell Aukrust (2000)
Resignasjon og portvin – novel (2002)
Dikteren på terskelen – essays (2005)
Von Aschenbachs fristelse – short story collection (2006)

Translated poetry 
Arthur Rimbaud: Illuminasjoner (1981), together with Arne Kjell Haugen
Stéphane Mallarmé: Utvalgte tekster (1983), together with Arne Kjell Haugen
Guillaume Apollinaire: Alkoholer (1985), together with Arne Kjell Haugen
Henri Michaux: Mellom sentrum og fravær (1989), together with Arne Kjell Haugen
Guillaume Apollinaire: Dyreboken eller Orfeus´ følge (originally ‘’Le bestiaire ou le cortège d’Orphée’’) (1998)
José Hierro: New York-notater (2004)
Édouard Glissant: De vestindiske øyer (2005)
Roberto Bolaño: De noveltiske hundene (2008), together with Kristina Solum

Prizes and recognition
Gyldendals legat 1977
Norwegian Critics Prize for Literature 1990
P2-lytternes novelpris 1997
Cappelenprisen 2002
Dobloug Prize 2007

References

1947 births
2018 deaths
20th-century Norwegian novelists
21st-century Norwegian novelists
Norwegian male short story writers
Norwegian children's writers
Members of the Norwegian Academy
Dobloug Prize winners
Writers from Oslo
20th-century Norwegian short story writers
21st-century Norwegian short story writers
20th-century Norwegian male writers
21st-century Norwegian male writers